Miss Spain 2015 may refer to these events:
Miss Universe Spain 2015, Miss Spain 2015 for Miss Universe 2015
Miss World Spain 2015, Miss Spain 2015 for Miss World 2015